Liapari is an island in the Solomon Islands; it is located in the Western Province.

Geography
Liapari Island is located to the southeast of Vella Lavella Island. There are remains of a U. S. Navy-built road.

See also

References

Islands of the Solomon Islands
Western Province (Solomon Islands)